Stephen Phillips (1864–1915) was an English poet.

Stephen Phillips may also refer to:
 Stephen Phillips (architect)
 Stephen Phillips (British politician) (born 1970), QC MP, barrister and former member of parliament
 Stephen Phillips (cricketer) (born 1980), Australian cricketer
 Stephen Phillips (judge) (born 1961), British judge
 Stephen C. Phillips  (1801–1857), U.S. Representative from Massachusetts
 Stephen Henry Phillips (1823–1897), Attorney General of both Massachusetts and Hawaii

See also
 Steve Phillips (disambiguation)